Are We Not Horses is an album by Rock Plaza Central. Despite being first released independently, the disc made many top ten lists for 2006, including #8 for CMJ Editor-in-Chief Kenny Herzog, Pitchfork staff writer Stephen Deusner and Americana-UK lead writer David Cowling. Because the album did not receive an official US release through Yep Roc Records until mid-2007, it made several of those year-end lists as well, including Magnet'''s "10 Great Hidden Treasures of 2007", calling it "2007's finest folk/rock find".

The album has also recently been taught in a graduate English course at the University of South Alabama, alongside frontman Chris Eaton's first novel, 2003's The Inactivist''.

Track listing 
 "I Am an Excellent Steel Horse" – 3:12
 "How Shall I to Heaven Aspire?" – 2:02
 "My Children, Be Joyful" – 5:51
 "Anthem for the Already Defeated" – 2:03
 "Fifteen Hands" – 3:50
 "Are We Not Horses?" – 3:06
 "When We Go, How We Go (Part 1)" – 2:25
 "Our Pasts, Like Lighthouses" – 4:13
 "8/14/03" – 0:56
 "Our Hearts Will Not Rust" – 3:44
 "When We Go, How We Go (Part II)" – 3:25
 "We've Got a Lot to Be Glad For" – 3:58

References 

2006 albums
Rock Plaza Central albums
Outside Music albums
Yep Roc Records albums